The First National Bank Building, at 502 S. Main St. in Rock Springs, Wyoming, is a historic building built in 1917.  Also known as Security Bank Building, it was listed on the National Register of Historic Places in 1980.

It is notable for "its dominance" of the skyline and architecture of Rock Springs;  the building includes "the most elaborate use of terra cotta in southwestern Wyoming".  It was designed by Walter J. Cooper and D.D. Spanni.

In the fall of 2020, a complete renovation of the building began. It will accommodate an array of commercial uses, with retail and office spaces.

References

External links
 First National Bank Building at the Wyoming State Historic Preservation Office

Commercial buildings completed in 1917
Buildings and structures in Rock Springs, Wyoming
Bank buildings on the National Register of Historic Places in Wyoming
National Register of Historic Places in Sweetwater County, Wyoming
Individually listed contributing properties to historic districts on the National Register in Wyoming
1917 establishments in Wyoming